The 27th Goya Awards were presented at the Madrid Marriott Auditorium Hotel in Madrid on February 17, 2013 to honour the best in Spanish films of 2012. Comedian Eva Hache was the master of ceremonies for the second year in a row. Nominees were announced on January 8, 2013. Snow White was nominated in every category for which it was eligible (except for Best Sound) and won ten awards, including Best Film, Best Actress and Best Original Screenplay.

Winners and nominees
The winners and nominees are listed as follows:

Major awards

Other award nominees

Honorary Goya
Concha Velasco

References

External links
Official site

27
2012 film awards
2012 in Spanish cinema
2013 in Madrid